Eupithecia cichisa is a moth in the family Geometridae first described by Louis Beethoven Prout in 1939. It is found in western China.

Taxonomy
The species was placed under Euchoeca for some time under the mistaken assumption that Prout had described it under that genus.

References

Moths described in 1939
cichisa
Moths of Asia